Langevåg Church is a parish church of the Church of Norway in Sula Municipality in Møre og Romsdal county, Norway. It is located in the village of Langevåg on the northern shore of the island of Sula. It is one of the two churches for the Sula parish which is part of the Nordre Sunnmøre prosti (deanery) in the Diocese of Møre. The white, stone church was built in a long church design in 1948 using plans drawn up by the architect Øyvind B. Grimnes. The church seats about 400 people.

History
Throughout history, the island of Sula was part of the Borgund Church parish. In 1932, small prayer house was opened in Langevåg where church services were sometimes held. Planning for a church building began soon after. Sverre Pedersen was first hired as an architect, but that fell through and ultimately the parish hired Øivind Berg Grimnes, who was a city architect in Ålesund. A building permit was issued in May 1941 and construction began soon after. By 1942, the roof was finished, enclosing the building, but then work stopped for a few years due to World War II. A royal resolution was issued in January 1946 formally authorizing the church and the new parish of Sula. The new church was consecrated on 12 June 1948. The building is a brick long church with an asymmetrically placed tower on the south side.

See also
List of churches in Møre

References

Sula, Møre og Romsdal
Churches in Møre og Romsdal
Stone churches in Norway
Long churches in Norway
20th-century Church of Norway church buildings
Churches completed in 1948
1948 establishments in Norway